Taranis borealis is a species of sea snail, a marine gastropod mollusk in the family Raphitomidae.

Description
The length of the shell varies between 2 mm and 3.5 mm.

Distribution
This marine species occurs off Senegal; also off Norway and Sweden.

References

External links
 Gastropods.com: Taranis borealis
 

borealis
Gastropods described in 1980